The 2020 South Carolina State Bulldogs football team represented South Carolina State University in the 2020–21 NCAA Division I FCS football season. They were led by 19th-year head coach Oliver Pough. The Bulldogs played their home games at Oliver C. Dawson Stadium. They competed as a member of the Mid-Eastern Athletic Conference (MEAC).

On July 16, 2020, the MEAC announced that it would cancel its fall sports seasons due to the COVID-19 pandemic. The league did not rule out the possibility of playing in the spring, and later released its spring schedule on December 14, 2020.

Schedule
South Carolina State's away and home games scheduled against Howard on March 6 and April 10, respectively, were canceled on March 2 due to COVID-19 travel restrictions.

References

South Carolina State
South Carolina State Bulldogs football seasons
South Carolina State Bulldogs football